East Greenbush is a census-designated place (CDP) in Rensselaer County, New York, United States. The population was 4,487 at the 2010 census.

East Greenbush is mostly within the southern part of the town of East Greenbush, but a small section of the community extends southward into the town of Schodack.

U.S. Routes 9 and 20 pass through the community, and the western end of U.S. Route 4 begins immediately north of the community.

Geography
East Greenbush is located at  (42.59263, -73.702402).

According to the United States Census Bureau, the CDP has a total area of 2.7 square miles (6.9 km2), all land.

Demographics

As of the census of 2000, there were 4,085 people, 1,568 households, and 1,133 families residing in the CDP. The population density was 1,542.4 per square mile (595.2/km2). There were 1,615 housing units at an average density of 609.8/sq mi (235.3/km2). The racial makeup of the CDP was 92.66% White, 3.21% Black or African American, 0.15% Native American, 2.59% Asian, 0.24% from other races, and 1.15% from two or more races. Hispanic or Latino of any race were 1.42% of the population.

There were 1,568 households, out of which 37.2% had children under the age of 18 living with them, 57.8% were married couples living together, 10.9% had a female householder with no husband present, and 27.7% were non-families. 20.9% of all households were made up of individuals, and 5.2% had someone living alone who was 65 years of age or older. The average household size was 2.60 and the average family size was 3.05.

In the CDP, the population was spread out, with 26.6% under the age of 18, 7.0% from 18 to 24, 31.3% from 25 to 44, 25.5% from 45 to 64, and 9.5% who were 65 years of age or older. The median age was 36 years. For every 100 females, there were 91.6 males. For every 100 females age 18 and over, there were 86.8 males.

The median income for a household in the CDP was $92,250, and the median income for a family was $75,375. Males had a median income of $62,610 versus $54,669 for females. The per capita income for the CDP was $74,492. About 2.1% of families and 2.7% of the population were below the poverty line, including 1.3% of those under age 18 and 5.5% of those age 65 or over.

References

Census-designated places in New York (state)
Census-designated places in Rensselaer County, New York